The 1989–90 Oregon State Beavers men's basketball team represented Oregon State University in Corvallis, Oregon in the 1989–90 season.

Led by first year head coach Jim Anderson and Pac-10 Player of the Year Gary Payton, the Beavers would earn the crown for the Pac 10 regular season. The Beavers were invited to the NCAA tournament, where they lost in the first round to Ball State. After this season, Payton would enter the NBA draft, and begin what would later become a hall of fame NBA Career.

Roster

Schedule and results

|-
!colspan=12 style=| Regular season

|-
!colspan=12 style=| Pac-10 Tournament

|-
!colspan=12 style=| NCAA Tournament

Sources

Rankings

Awards and honors
Gary Payton – Pac-10 Player of the Year and Consensus First-team All-American
Jim Anderson – Pac-10 Coach of the Year

Team Players in the 1990 NBA draft

References

Oregon State
Oregon State Beavers men's basketball seasons
Oregon State
Oregon State
Oregon State